Laos is divided into 17 provinces (Lao: ແຂວງ, khoueng) and 1 prefecture (kampheng nakhon), or capital city municipality (ນະຄອນຫລວງ, nakhon luang). Furthermore, 1 so-called special administrative zone (ເຂດພິເສດ, khet phiset) existed between 1994 and 2006, when it was re-merged into its surrounding provinces (i.e. Vientiane and Xiangkhoang). The Xaisomboun special administrative zone was later recreated as the 17th province. Each province is subdivided into districts (Lao: ເມືອງ, mueang) and then subdivided into villages (Lao: ບ້ານ, baan).

Districts of Laos 

Note — Each district has a code in parentheses displaying the first two digits as the province and the last two as the district representing that province.

References

External links 
 
 
 Laos Ministry of Education district maps (archive)

 
Subdivisions of Laos
Laos, Districts
Laos 2
Districts, Laos
Districts